Calhoun County is a county in the U.S. state of South Carolina. As of the 2020 census, its population was 14,119, making it the third-least populous county in the state. Its county seat is St. Matthews. In terms of land area, it is also the smallest county in the state.

Located in a rural upland area long devoted to cotton plantations, part of the Black Belt of the South, the county was formed in 1908 from portions of Lexington and Orangeburg counties. It is named for John C. Calhoun, the former U.S. Vice-President, Senator, Representative and cabinet member from South Carolina, although Calhoun was from nearby Abbeville, South Carolina.

Calhoun County is part of the Columbia, SC Metropolitan Statistical Area. It has an overall score of 52 including factors health, crime, equity, education, and housing. It is one of 11 counties with the same name in the United States.

History
Calhoun County was home to the Congaree Tribe.  As early as 1715 maps show them living in the region.  As well, arrowheads and other artifacts continue to be found in lakes and near rivers.

During the American Revolutionary War, Calhoun County was home to the famous Siege of Fort Motte.  The Fort Motte Battle Site is accessible today.

World famous Buck n' Boar hunting club imports game from all over the world, and currently has the U.S.' largest herd of pure Eurasian swine. In addition to Buck n' Boar Calhoun County is home to many private hunting preserves.

As of 2011, Calhoun County contained an illegal dumping of an estimated 250,000 vehicle tires, a mound of tires so large it could reportedly be seen from space.

Geography

It is the second-smallest county in South Carolina by land area and smallest by total area.

Calhoun County includes features such as Lake Marion, and the Congaree Bluffs, accessible publicly via the Congaree Bluffs Heritage Preserve.

Calhoun County borders Congaree National Park, the only Federally recognized Park which is a Swamp.  Astonishing biodiversity exists in Congaree National Park, the largest intact expanse of old growth bottomland hardwood forest remaining in the southeastern United States. Waters from the Congaree and Wateree Rivers sweep through the floodplain, carrying nutrients and sediments that nourish and rejuvenate this ecosystem and support the growth of national and state champion trees.  Although the park lies outside the boundaries of Calhoun County, much of the environment is similar.

The upper boundary for Calhoun County is the Congaree River.

State and local protected area 
 Congaree Bluffs Heritage Preserve

Major water bodies 
 Big Beaver Creek
 Branham Branch
 Congaree River
 Four Hole Swamp
 Lake Marion
 Little Limestone Creek

Adjacent counties
 Richland County - north
 Sumter County - northeast
 Clarendon County - east
 Orangeburg County - south
 Lexington County - northwest

Major highways 
 
 
 
 
 
 
 
 
 

Calhoun County is part of the evacuation route for Hurricanes and coastal flooding.  During such times there are lane reversals where interstate highway I-26 goes in one direction (northwest).

Demographics

In 2017, Calhoun County, SC had a population of 14.8k people with a median age of 45.9 and a median household income of $44,010. Between 2016 and 2017 the population of Calhoun County, SC declined from 14,886 to 14,808, a -0.524% decrease and its median household income grew from $42,779 to $44,010, a 2.88% increase.  The population of Calhoun County, SC is 53.6% White Alone, 41.6% Black or African American Alone, and 3.58% Hispanic or Latino. N/A% of the people in Calhoun County, SC speak a non-English language, and 98.3% are U.S. citizens.  The median property value in Calhoun County, SC is $103,900, and the homeownership rate is 79.3%. Most people in Calhoun County, SC commute by Drove Alone, and the average commute time is 27.2 minutes. The average car ownership in Calhoun County, SC is 2 cars per household.

2020 census

As of the 2020 United States Census, there were 14,119 people, 6,179 households, and 3,910 families residing in the county.

2010 census
As of the 2010 United States Census, there were 15,175 people, 6,080 households, and 4,204 families living in the county. The racial makeup of the county was 53.9% white, 42.6% black or African American, 0.3% American Indian, 0.2% Asian, 0.1% Pacific islander, 1.8% from other races, and 1.2% from two or more races. Those of Hispanic or Latino origin made up 3.0% of the population. In terms of ancestry, respondents identified as 42.6% of African American (which may include European ancestry; 15.4% American, 14.9% German, 8.5% Irish, and 7.1% of English heritage.

Of the 6,080 households, 30.3% had children under the age of 18 living with them, 48.6% were married couples living together, 15.9% had a female householder with no husband present, 30.9% were non-families, and 26.8% of all households were made up of individuals. The average household size was 2.47 and the average family size was 2.99. The median age was 43.4 years.

The median income for a household in the county was $36,790 and the median income for a family was $51,975. Males had a median income of $42,394 versus $31,001 for females. The per capita income for the county was $20,845. About 11.6% of families and 15.8% of the population were below the poverty line, including 22.4% of those under age 18 and 15.6% of those age 65 or over.

2000 census
As of the census of 2000, there were 15,185 people, 5,917 households, and 4,272 families living in the county.  The population density was 40 people per square mile (15/km2).  There were 6,864 housing units at an average density of 18 per square mile (7/km2).  The racial makeup of the county was 50.03% White, 48.69% Black or African American, 0.19% Native American, 0.14% Asian, 0.03% Pacific Islander, 0.24% from other races, and 0.69% from two or more races.  1.40% of the population were Hispanic or Latino of any race.

There were 5,917 households, out of which 30.20% had children under the age of 18 living with them, 52.00% were married couples living together, 15.80% had a female householder with no husband present, and 27.80% were non-families. 24.50% of all households were made up of individuals, and 9.60% had someone living alone who was 65 years of age or older.  The average household size was 2.54 and the average family size was 3.03.

In the county, the population was spread out, with 25.10% under the age of 18, 7.40% from 18 to 24, 27.00% from 25 to 44, 26.70% from 45 to 64, and 13.80% who were 65 years of age or older.  The median age was 39 years. For every 100 females, there were 90.10 males.  For every 100 females age 18 and over, there were 86.40 males.

The median income for a household in the county was $32,736, and the median income for a family was $39,823. Males had a median income of $31,431 versus $22,267 for females. The per capita income for the county was $17,446.  About 13.20% of families and 16.20% of the population were below the poverty line, including 20.40% of those under age 18 and 18.30% of those age 65 or over.

Government and politics
The county government is a five-member council, elected from single-member districts. At the first meeting of the year, they choose a chairperson for the term; it is a rotating position.

Other elected positions in the county are Sheriff, Auditor, Coroner, Treasurer, and Clerk of Court. appointed positions are Coroner and Probate Judge.

Calhoun County Library is a historic library building located at St. Matthews, Calhoun County. It was built about 1877, and is a one-story, medium-gabled white clapboard structure in the Greek Revival style. It was originally built as a residence, but was adapted for use as a county library in 1949.

Economy
Although much of Calhoun County is rural, there are many factories including Devro, a UK company that makes sausage casings. Other factories include Starbucks (Roasting Facility), DAK Americas, Zeus Industrial Products, Fitts Co Inc, and Thermo King Columbia, Inc.  In the same part of the county Country Clear, Inc. produces bottled water.

Calhoun County offers the Calhoun County I-26 Industrial Park for businesses.

Communities

Towns
 Cameron
 St. Matthews (county seat and largest town)

Unincorporated communities
 Creston
 Fort Motte
 Lone Star
 Sandy Run

See also
 List of counties in South Carolina
 National Register of Historic Places listings in Calhoun County, South Carolina

References

External links

 
 
 Calhoun County history and images

 
1908 establishments in South Carolina
Populated places established in 1908
Columbia metropolitan area (South Carolina)